José Ramón Beca Borrego (born 8 April 1953) is a Spanish-born equestrian, who has been competing for Uruguay since 2015. He competed at the 1988 Summer Olympics, the 1996 Summer Olympics and the 2000 Summer Olympics.

References

External links
 

1953 births
Living people
Spanish male equestrians
Uruguayan male equestrians
Uruguayan dressage riders
Olympic equestrians of Spain
Equestrians at the 1988 Summer Olympics
Equestrians at the 1996 Summer Olympics
Equestrians at the 2000 Summer Olympics
Equestrians at the 2015 Pan American Games
Equestrians at the 2019 Pan American Games
Sportspeople from Seville
Pan American Games competitors for Uruguay